Sven Christians (born 28 January 1967) is a retired German football defender.

References

External links
 

1967 births
Living people
German footballers
Bundesliga players
2. Bundesliga players
Wuppertaler SV players
VfL Bochum players
SV Babelsberg 03 players
Borussia Neunkirchen players
Association football defenders